The following events in the sport of athletics took place in 2006:

Championships
 March: 2006 IAAF World Indoor Championships (part of the IAAF World Athletics Series)
 March: 2006 Commonwealth Games
 April: 2006 IAAF World Cross Country Championships (part of the IAAF World Athletics Series)
 May: 2006 IAAF World Race Walking Cup (part of the IAAF World Athletics Series)
 July: 2006 Central American and Caribbean Games
 August: 2006 European Championships in Athletics
 August: 2006 African Championships in Athletics
 August: 2006 World Junior Championships in Athletics (part of the IAAF World Athletics Series)
 September: 2006 IAAF World Athletics Final (part of the IAAF World Athletics Series)
 September: 2006 IAAF World Cup (part of the IAAF World Athletics Series)
 October: 2006 Lusophony Games
 October: 2006 IAAF World Road Running Championships (part of the IAAF World Athletics Series)

World Athletics Tour
The World Athletics Tour is a tournament where athletes accumulate points from placing in designated meets throughout the season. The top-ranking athletes in each event are then allowed entry in the IAAF World Athletics Final.

In 2006 the World Athletics Tour consisted of six IAAF Golden League meets (Oslo, Paris, Rome, Zurich, Brussels, Berlin), six Super Grand Prix meets (Doha, Athens, Lausanne, Stockholm, London (Crystal Palace), Monaco), twelve Grand Prix meets (Melbourne, Dakar, Osaka, Belém, Eugene, Hengelo, Ostrava, Gateshead, Madrid, Helsinki, Rieti, Zagreb) as well as 26 Area Permit Meetings all over the world. The World Athletics Final was held in Stuttgart, having been staged in Monaco the three previous years.

Challenges
In certain events that are not included in the World Athletics Final, currently race walking and combined events (formerly also cross-country running), distinct tournaments, named challenges, are being held. Similarly to the World Athletics Tour, the participating athletes accumulate points in designated meets, however in this case the final ranking is decided by the points table and not a conclusive meet.

See IAAF World Race Walking Challenge and IAAF World Combined Events Challenge for the 2006 results.

World records

Senior

Outdoor

Indoor

Notes

Junior

Outdoor

Awards

Men

Women

Awards
At the 2006 World Athletics Gala in Monaco Asafa Powell and Sanya Richards were given the IAAF World Athlete of the Year awards for men and women respectively.

At the same time Liu Xiang and Meseret Defar were recognized with the Performance of the Year awards for men and women, for their new world records (see above). The Rising Star Award was given to Margus Hunt for his world junior records, and the Coaches’ Award was given to Woldemeskel Kostre of Ethiopia. Hicham El Guerrouj, Stefka Kostadinova and Jan Železný were presented Distinguished Career Awards.

Transfers of eligibility
See list of eligibility transfers in athletics

Men's Best Year Performances

100 metres

200 metres

400 metres

800 metres

1,500 metres

Mile

3,000 metres

5,000 metres

10,000 metres

Race walking

110m Hurdles

400m Hurdles

3,000m Steeplechase

Pole Vault

Hammer Throw

Decathlon

Women's Best Year Performances

100 metres

200 metres

Half Marathon

Race walking

100m Hurdles

400m Hurdles

3,000m Steeplechase

High Jump

Pole Vault

Hammer Throw

Heptathlon

Marathon

Men's competition

Commonwealth Games

European championships

Asian Games

Best Year Performances

Women's competition

Commonwealth Games

European championships

Asian Games

Best Year Performances

Deaths
 March 9 – Erik Elmsäter (86), Swedish long-distance runner (b. 1919)
 August 9 – Chinatsu Mori (26), Japanese shot putter (b. 1980)

References
 World Athletics Tour 2006 – official IAAF site
 World Combined Events Challenge 2006 – official IAAF site
 
 World records.
 ARRS
 Marathon results.

 
Athletics (track and field) by year